The Andes giant glass frog (Espadarana andina) is a species of frog in the family Centrolenidae. It is found in the Cordillera Oriental of Colombia and the Mérida Andes and Serranía del Perijá of Venezuela. 

Its natural habitats are cloud forests and montane evergreen dry forests. It lives along mountain streams and lays its eggs on vegetation over the streams. It is not considered threatened by the IUCN.

Reproductive patterns 
A study conducted in a stream located in the Vereda Agua Blanca, Río Frio River basin in Santander, Colombia, analyzed patterns of reproduction sites in Espadarana andina. The study concluded that preferences for sites used by males to call for females, and for females to oviposit (lay eggs) was not impacted by environmental factors such as transitions to and from rainy and dry seasons, time of day, or month of the year. The study showed that oviposition occurred the most on the invasive plant Hedychium coronarium.

Development 
The offspring is characterized by spots and a brown cast over their skin. However, much like their adult forms, the offspring possesses translucent skin, and perhaps most noticeably, the chondrocranium underneath is visible. The frogs starts maturation in its eyes and nares. In the initial stages, the nares grow closer to the eyes than the snout, but as the frog develops, its nares grows closer to its snout. And, in the initial stages, its eyesight is not developed but as it matures, so does its eyesight. This is because the tadpole's eyes develop dorsolateral abilities, which means that it develops functioning eyesight. As for the beak and snout, tadpoles have keratinized beaks that later disappear while its denticles turn into papillae. Moreover, the fins that are responsible for propelling tadpoles through water form into legs through its development as a tadpole and then a frog.

References

andina
Amphibians of the Andes
Amphibians of Colombia
Amphibians of Venezuela
Taxa named by Juan A. Rivero
Amphibians described in 1968
Taxonomy articles created by Polbot